Allis-Chalmers Energy Inc. is an American, Houston-based, oil company which provides both services and equipment to oil and natural gas companies throughout the Gulf of Mexico and in surrounding states and countries.

History
The name "Allis-Chalmers" is most well known as the name of the former company, Allis-Chalmers Manufacturing Company. In February 2011, Allis-Chalmers Energy merged with Seawell to form specialist drilling and well service company Archer.

References

Companies formerly listed on the New York Stock Exchange
Oil companies of the United States
Companies based in Houston